The 2022–23 Ukrainian Premier League season, referred to as the VBet Liha for sponsorship reasons, is the 32nd top-level football club competition since the fall of the Soviet Union and the 15th since the establishment of the Ukrainian Premier League.

The defending champions are the 16-time winners Dynamo Kyiv. The previous 2021–22 season was abandoned due to the 2022 Russian invasion of Ukraine. Although Shakhtar Donetsk were at the top of the table when the league was abandoned, no title was officially awarded ("The handing out of awards to the league's medalists will not take place").

The current season began on 23 August 2022 and will end on 3 June 2023.

Preparation 
Due to the full-scale invasion of Russia, teams were discussing the possibility of playing in western Ukraine as well as Poland. On 27 May 2022, a conference was held in the House of Football involving participants of the Ukrainian Premier League along with the UAF presidium. Topics discussed at the conference included the continuation of the league, possible places and dates of conducting it as well as its format for the future season. On 25 June, the league's executive director, Yevhen Dykyi, explained that the season was expected to start on 20 August in the usual format with 16 participants. Later, the president of the Ukrainian Association of Football clarified that the only teams allowed to play abroad would be those still in continental competitions, subject to their opponents' agreement.

Some football functionaries criticised conducting the competitions due to risks of deliberate Russian missile attacks.

Teams
This season the Ukrainian Premier League has kept 16 teams, which includes 14 teams from the previous season and the top two teams from the 2021–22 Ukrainian First League. Two teams had their status suspended due to the Russian occupation and/or destruction of their sports infrastructure.

Promoted teams
 Metalist Kharkiv – first-placed team of the 2021–22 Ukrainian First League (debut, a phoenix club of another Metalist Kharkiv that last competed in 2015–16)
 Kryvbas Kryvyi Rih – second-placed team of the 2021–22 Ukrainian First League (debut, a phoenix club of another Kryvbas Kryvyi Rih that last competed in 2012–13)

Omitted teams
 Mariupol – the 16th place team of the 2021–22 Ukrainian Premier League (ending their five-year stay in the top-flight)
 Desna Chernihiv – the 7th place team of the 2021–22 Ukrainian Premier League (ending their four-year stay in the top-flight)

In case if one or both Desna and Mariupol decide to return to the league competitions next season, it is predetermined that the league team pool would be increased to 18 teams.

Location map

Stadiums 

The minimum threshold for the stadium's capacity in the UPL is 4,500 (Article 10, paragraph 8.3). With the ongoing Russian aggression clubs were forced to relocate to western parts of the country with the Ukrainian Association of Football listed its certified stadiums for the season competitions. It was decided that the main regions in which permitted to conduct competitions are Kyiv city, Kyiv Oblast, Lviv Oblast and Zakarpattia Oblast. A match could take place in other regions on permission of a regional military administration and agreement from the opposing club.

The following stadiums are regarded as home grounds:

Personnel and sponsorship

Managerial changes

League table

Results
Teams play each other twice on a home and away basis.

Season statistics

Top goalscorers

Assists

Clean sheets

Awards

Monthly awards

Round awards

See also 
 2022–23 Ukrainian First League
 2022–23 Ukrainian Second League
 2022–23 Ukrainian Football Amateur League
 2022–23 Ukrainian Women's League
 List of Ukrainian football transfers summer 2022

Notes

References

External links 
 Official website of the Ukrainian Premier League
 The season's calendar planner. Ukrainian Association of Football (MS spreadsheet)
 The season's calendar planner. Ukrainian Premier League. (pdf format)

Ukrainian Premier League seasons
1
Ukraine
Sports events affected by the 2022 Russian invasion of Ukraine
Ukraine